KSMS-TV (channel 67) is a television station licensed to Monterey, California, United States, serving the Monterey Bay area as an affiliate of the Spanish-language Univision network. It is owned by Entravision Communications alongside Class A UniMás affiliate KDJT-CD (channel 33, licensed to both Salinas and Monterey). KSMS-TV and KDJT-CD share studios on Garden Court south of Monterey Regional Airport in Monterey; through a channel sharing agreement, the two stations transmit using KDJT-CD's spectrum from an antenna atop Fremont Peak.

History

KSMS-TV was founded by Bill Schuyler on September 1, 1986. In the same year, KCBA, the only television station broadcasting in Spanish in the area, was sold to the Ackerley Group. Ackerley decided to make KCBA an English-language station affiliated with the then-emerging Fox network, which would have left the Salinas–Monterey–Santa Cruz television market without a Spanish-language television station. Knowing that Schuyler had a permit to build a station in the market, a former manager of KCBA encouraged Schuyler to seize the opportunity to create a new station to serve the Hispanic community as an affiliate of the Spanish International Network (the predecessor of Univision).

Schuyler assembled a team of four television professionals and challenge them to develop the new station before KCBA's relaunch. The multiple tasks of creating a new station from the ground up were divided among the four individuals. The group found an old building on Garden Road, which coincidentally had been the first home of KMST-TV (now KION-TV), which Schuyler had started in 1969 and sold a decade later. After negotiating the lease, the remodeling of the old building started immediately. A studio was built in the first floor, along with a small production area, a sound booth and the master control area. After much searching for a suitable transmitter, one was found and installed along with an antenna, atop of Fremont Peak, overlooking the Salinas Valley. Production and broadcasting equipment was purchased and installed, support personnel hired, a small news team was assembled and the station went on the air on time.

News operation
KSMS operates its 6 and 11 p.m. newscasts, each running about 30 minutes each, totaling 10 hours per week. KSMS does not broadcast any local news on weekends. KSMS currently competes with the recent addition of rival KMUV-LP, after KMUV-LP's newscasts were added in September 2009 under its current ownership by the Cowles Publishing Company. KSMS also covers national news and news from Latin America. KSMS started its newscasts in November 1987, a few days after Fidel M. Soto joined the station.  Soto is currently the longest tenured personality since KSMS's inception.

Technical information

Subchannels
The station's digital signal is multiplexed:

In June 2010, KSMS began broadcasting in 16:9 HDTV ratio in time for the 2010 FIFA World Cup.

Analog-to-digital conversion
KSMS-TV shut down its analog signal, over UHF channel 67, on June 12, 2009, the official date in which full-power television stations in the United States transitioned from analog to digital broadcasts under federal mandate. The station's digital signal remained on its pre-transition UHF channel 31. Through the use of PSIP, digital television receivers display the station's virtual channel as its former UHF analog channel 67, which was among the high band UHF channels (52-69) that were removed from broadcasting use as a result of the transition.

References

External links
 

Television channels and stations established in 1986
SMS-TV
1986 establishments in California
SMS-TV
Entravision Communications stations